Statistics of American Soccer League II in season 1975.

League standings

Playoffs

Bracket

Semifinals

Championship
*Play suspended after 9 sudden-death overtimes; teams declared co-champions by commissioner Bob Cousy.

References

American Soccer League II (RSSSF)

	

American Soccer League (1933–1983) seasons
2